The African Newsletter on Occupational Health and Safety has been published since 1991 by the Finnish Institute of Occupational Health and is financially supported by the World Health Organization and the International Labour Organization.

External links 
 

Publications established in 1991
Open access journals
Occupational safety and health journals
Triannual journals
English-language journals
1991 establishments in Finland